Mythologie  is the fourteenth studio album by Canadian new age/electronic music group Delerium, released in 2016. It is their first album for Metropolis Records. The album was produced by Bill Leeb and Rhys Fulber with the help of Jared Slingerland and Craig Johnsen.

The cover was designed by UK artist Dave McKean, who has worked with Leeb on Front Line Assembly covers in the past.

Track listing

References

2016 albums
Delerium albums
Metropolis Records albums
Albums produced by Rhys Fulber
Albums with cover art by Dave McKean